Konstantinos Koumoundouros (20 November 1846 – 26 January 1924) was an officer in the Hellenic Army as well as a politician.

Biography
Konstantinos Koumoundouros was born at Oitylo or Kalamata in 1846, the son of the politician and multiple Prime Minister of Greece, Alexandros Koumoundouros (1817–1883). The younger Koumoundouros entered the Hellenic Army Academy, graduating in 1871 as an Ensign, while following in parallel a political career, being elected mayor of Oitylo and entering the Hellenic Parliament as an MP for his native Messenia in 1879, being repeatedly re-elected until 1922. Initially a supporter of Theodoros Deligiannis, under whom he served as Minister for Naval Affairs in 1890–92, Koumoundouros quarrelled with Deligiannis and went over to his rival, Charilaos Trikoupis.

In the Greco-Turkish War of 1897, Deligiannis, with the rank of major, commanded a battalion in the Epirus front, and was defeated at the Battle of Pente Pigadia, losing a fifth of his troops. In 1899, he was appointed Minister of Military Affairs in Georgios Theotokis' cabinet. His last political office was as Speaker of the 18th Parliament in the 1908–1909 term. Koumoundouros was discharged from the Army in 1908, with the rank of lieutenant general.

He died at Athens in 1924.

References

1846 births
1924 deaths
Greek military personnel of the Greco-Turkish War (1897)
Greek MPs 1879–1881
Greek MPs 1885–1887
Greek MPs 1887–1890
Greek MPs 1890–1892
Greek MPs 1892–1895
Greek MPs 1895–1899
Greek MPs 1899–1902
Greek MPs 1902–1905
Greek MPs 1905–1906
Greek MPs 1906–1910
Greek MPs 1910 (August–November)
Greek MPs 1912–1915
Greek MPs 1915–1917
Greek MPs 1920–1922
Hellenic Army lieutenant generals
Ministers of Military Affairs of Greece
Ministers of Naval Affairs of Greece
People from Kalamata
Speakers of the Hellenic Parliament
Greek MPs 1910–1912
People from East Mani